Plusiodonta is a genus of moths in the family Erebidae erected by Achille Guenée in 1852.

Description
Palpi upturned, where the second joint roughly scaled and reaching vertex of head or above it. Thorax and abdomen slender without tufts. Forewings with somewhat acute apex. The outer margin more or less angled at vein 4. Inner margin with tufts of scales at center and outer angle, the margin being excised between them. Legs smoothly scaled. Antennae bipectinated in male. Larva with two pairs of abdominal prolegs.

Species
 Plusiodonta aborta Dognin, 1910
 Plusiodonta achalcea Hampson, 1926
 Plusiodonta amado Barnes, 1907 (syn: Plusiodonta suffusa Hill, 1924)
 Plusiodonta arctipennis Butler, 1886
 Plusiodonta auripicta Moore, 1882
 Plusiodonta basirhabdota Hampson, 1926
 Plusiodonta casta Butler, 1878
 Plusiodonta chalcomera Hampson, 1926
 Plusiodonta clavifera Walker, 1868
 Plusiodonta cobaltina Viette, 1956
 Plusiodonta coelonota Kollar & Redtenbacher, 1844
 Plusiodonta commoda Walker, 1865
 Plusiodonta compressipalpis Guenée in Boisduval and Guenée, 1852 – moonseed moth
 Plusiodonta cupristria Kaye, 1922
 Plusiodonta dimorpha Robinson, 1975
 Plusiodonta effulgens Edwards, 1884
 Plusiodonta euchalcia Hampson, 1926
 Plusiodonta excavata Guenée, 1862
 Plusiodonta gueneei Viette, 1968
 Plusiodonta incitans Walker, 1857
 Plusiodonta ionochrota Hampson, 1926
 Plusiodonta macra Hampson, 1926
 Plusiodonta malagasy Viette, 1968
 Plusiodonta megista Hampson, 1926
 Plusiodonta miranda Schaus, 1911
 Plusiodonta multicolora Bethune-Baker, 1906
 Plusiodonta natalensis Walker, 1865
 Plusiodonta nictites Hampson, 1902
 Plusiodonta nitissima Schaus, 1911
 Plusiodonta repellens Walker, 1857
 Plusiodonta speciosissima Holland, 1894
 Plusiodonta stimulans Walker, 1857
 Plusiodonta theresae Holloway, 1979
 Plusiodonta thomae Guenée in Boisduval and Guenée, 1852
 Plusiodonta tripuncta Bethune-Baker, 1906
 Plusiodonta wahlbergi Felder & Rogenhofer, 1874

References

Calpinae
Moth genera